De Camino Pa' La Cima Reloaded is the fourth studio album by Puerto Rican reggaeton singer-songwriter J Álvarez. It was released by On Top of the World Music, and exclusively distributed by Sony Music Entertainment on January 27, 2015. The album is the follow up of his last album De Camino Pa' La Cima.

The album debuted at the #1 position on the Billboard Latin Rhythm Albums and held that spot for about a month. It features collaborations from Cosculluela, Zion, Mackie, Baby Rasta & Gringo, Divino, Tego Calderon, Wisin, De La Ghetto, and Jowell & Randy.

Track listing

Remixes

References 

2015 albums
J Alvarez albums